Sir Henry Edmonds (1605–1635) was an English politician who sat in the House of Commons from 1625 to 1626.

Edmonds was the son of Sir Thomas Edmonds of the Privy Council and his first wife Magdalen Wood, daughter of Sir John Wood. He matriculated at Christ Church, Oxford on 16 December 1620, aged 15 and was awarded BA on 13 February 1623.

In 1625, Edmonds was elected Member of Parliament for Newton. He was knighted in February 1626. He was re-elected MP for Newton in 1626. 
 
Edmonds is said to have died an "inveterate drunkard" at the age of about 30.

References

1605 births
1635 deaths
Alumni of Christ Church, Oxford
English MPs 1625
English MPs 1626